Liam Kyle Sullivan (born July 17, 1973) is an American comedian, actor, director and video editor. Sullivan has made several guest appearances on television programs—including Gilmore Girls, 8 Simple Rules, and Alias—but is best known for his internet videos. He won a 2008 People's Choice Award in the user-generated video category for "Shoes". He starred in the VH1 series I Hate My 30's.

Skits

Characters portrayed by Sullivan
Kelly is a stereotypical teenage American girl. She doesn't care about much besides her mundane desires and has intense mood swings. She is also a musician, and it is implied that the family is aware of the music videos.
Chris is Kelly's twin brother. He is an athlete who has joined the abstinence program, and has a well-known sibling rivalry with Kelly. Their parents favor him over Kelly.
Mother Grandma is an affectionate, anxious old lady who is fond of whiskey and tries to share it with everyone because she believes it "makes you feel better". She appears to be tipsy most of the time and is known to make non-sequitur comments. There is a bit of tension between her and the parents, and the two utter negative remarks about each other under their breaths. She has her own set of spin-off videos.
Bill is Kelly's father. Strict and often stern-faced, he doesn't say much, but likes to stay in charge of the family and set the rules, and is a strong believer in "fiscal responsibility".
Aunt Susan Walker is a lesbian musician. She likes to stay positive and is involved with a woman named María (not played by Sullivan). She is involved with an organic vegan girl-on-girl sandwich tour. She also has her own set of spin-off videos.
Bob Tulap is a foul-mouthed radio announcer with a strong liking for whiskey but a hatred for his producer, Doug. "Bob Tulap hates everyone and everything, including his sponsors."

Kelly, Susan Walker and other characters

Kelly, a cross-dressed Sullivan, has released an album entitled Shoes digitally through TuneCore, which consists of tracks recorded by herself, her ex-boyfriend, and her mom. "Shoes" is also the name of Kelly's biggest hit, which won a People's Choice Award for best user-generated video. Her music videos have featured guest stars such as Margaret Cho, Amanda Palmer, Dave Navarro, Lisa Nova, and the Ask a Ninja.

Another of Sullivan's characters, Susan Walker, who is Kelly's aunt, has also released an album of music, Susan Walker's Greatest Tits. The album largely consists of country music songs with explicit sexual themes, such as "Two Way Dildo" and "Shut Up and Fuck Me". The songs, however, are sung in a light-hearted, almost loving manner. Two videos have been made of songs from the album; these are "I Like to Tinker" and "Shut Up and Fuck Me". However, these songs and videos have not received the acclaim nor the large number of views that Kelly's videos have.

The other videos listed below, "Dr. Ulee Sex Therapist", "Muffins", and "Love Letters", are all separate individual skits by Sullivan.

Discography

Albums
Shoes (2006)
Susan Walker's Greatest Tits (2009)

Music videos
Sullivan has uploaded and deleted the music videos several times, so it is somewhat unclear what year and further, (although not shown here) what month they were released in, which also confuses the order and the number of views they have received. Other YouTube users have also uploaded the videos and received, in some cases, millions of views of the videos as well.

Other videos
"Love Letters" (2006)
"Muffins" (2006)
"Dr. Ulee Sex Therapist" (2009; Counterpart to the single "Dr. Ulee's Erotic Stories" read by Shang Tze Tung, released earlier in 2008.)
”Breakfast Loaves” (2022; an update to the Muffins video, substituting Breakfast Loaves sold by Magnolia Bakery for the original muffins.)

Other appearances
In 1997, Sullivan briefly appeared in a Buffy the Vampire Slayer episode entitled "Reptile Boy" as a cross-dressing fraternity pledge.
In 2000, portrayed the male lead "Brant" in the horror film "The Convent." 
In 2004, he appeared in the 8 Simple Rules episodes "Mall in the Family" and "Finale Part Un" as Zack.
In 2005, he appeared in the 8 Simple Rules episode "Freaky Friday" as Dorkie Dwaine McDoogle.
In 2005, he appeared in the Gilmore Girls episode "Wedding Bellblues" as "Photographer".
In 2007, Sullivan appeared as Kelly in The Dresden Dolls' music video for "Shores of California".
He also appeared as Kelly in the VH1 series I Hate My 30's, performing "Forget It, Just Get It!"
In 2008, Sullivan appeared as Kelly in the Weezer music video for "Pork and Beans", which also featured many other internet stars.
He appeared at the LOGO Network's NewNowNext Awards in 2008 portraying Kelly.
He opened for Margaret Cho's "Beautiful" Tour throughout 2008, playing Kelly and several of his other characters.
In 2010, his song, "My Romantic Pattern" was featured in the season 1 episode "One Cold Swim Away" of the comedy drama Gravity.
Sullivan worked as an editor on Smosh.
In 2016, he made an appearance on the Fine Brothers' YouTube channel in a video called "YouTubers react to Shoes (Viral Video Classic)".

References

External links

 Official site
 

1973 births
Living people

American male comedians
21st-century American comedians
American directors
Internet memes
Male actors from Boston
People from Norfolk, Massachusetts